Survivor Song is a 2020 horror novel by American author Paul Tremblay. It was first published on July 7, 2020 through William Morrow and centers upon people struggling to survive while a highly infectious virus decimates Massachusetts. 

Two characters from Tremblay's 2017 novel Disappearance at Devil's Rock, Josh and Luis, appear in the novel.

Synopsis
The state of Massachusetts is under quarantine and curfew by the government due to a new virus that resembles rabies and is extremely infectious. These measures are only a stopgap, as hospitals are ill-equipped to deal with both virus victims and their regular capacity. People are terrified and it is only a matter of time before the emergency protocols become inadequate. The novel follows Natalie, a pregnant woman, and her friend Ramola "Rams" Sherman, a pediatrician, as they try to fight their way to the hospital to obtain the rabies vaccine. Natalie has been bitten by an infected neighbor while unsuccessfully trying to defend her husband, who was suddenly attacked.

Development
Tremblay began writing Survivor Song in 2018 and completed his final edits by fall 2019, prior to the COVID-19 pandemic. His inspiration for the book was to "take on a trope of horror, tweak it and ground it in reality" and has noted that he believes that "humanity's struggles with rabies through the centuries have led to most of the human monsters we've created in folklore and myth". While writing Tremblay was initially concerned that some portions of the book would not seem realistic, specifically the conspiracy theories held by a group of right-wing militiamen. After the spread of COVID-19 and conspiracy theories surrounding the virus, he stated that "If anything, I probably should have given them more outlandish beliefs, based on some of the reactions to the coronavirus."

Publication
Survivor Song was first released in the United States in hardback and ebook format on July 7, 2020 through William Morrow. An audiobook adaptation, narrated by Erin Bennett, was simultaneously released through HarperAudio. It was also published in the United Kingdom through Titan Books, also on July 7, 2020.

Reception
Multiple reviewers have drawn comparisons between the rabies-esque virus in Survivor Song and the COVID-19 pandemic, with the New York Times and Tor.com stating that it was a timely read. Writing for the New York Times, Justin Cronin stated that "City shutdowns, overrun hospitals, a bungled government response, public disorder, roving wing-nut militias, conspiracy theories — it's all here, right down to long lines at Star Market. Before this winter, the whole thing might've looked like escapist fancy. Now it looks like your Twitter feed." Jason Sheehan of NPR praised the book, as he felt that "Survivor Song is a small horror story. A personal one. A fast and terrible one that is committed beautifully to the page."

References

External links
 

2020 American novels
American horror novels
2020s horror novels
Fictional viruses
Novels by Paul Tremblay
William Morrow and Company books